This is a list of all the champions of the women's doubles event for the Australian Open.

Champions

Australasian Championships

Australian Championships

Australian Open

Notes

References

See also

Australian Open other competitions
List of Australian Open men's singles champions
List of Australian Open men's doubles champions
List of Australian Open women's singles champions
List of Australian Open mixed doubles champions

Grand Slam women's doubles
List of French Open women's doubles champions
List of Wimbledon ladies' doubles champions
List of US Open women's doubles champions
List of Grand Slam women's doubles champions

women
Australian Open
Australian Open